This is a list of published recordings of Antônio Carlos Jobim.

Discography

Studio albums
 1963: The Composer of Desafinado, Plays (Verve)
 1965: The Wonderful World of Antonio Carlos Jobim (Warner Bros.)
 1966: Love, Strings and Jobim (Warner Bros.)
 1967: A Certain Mr. Jobim (Warner Bros.)
 1967: Wave (CTI/A&M)
 1970: Stone Flower (CTI)
 1970: Tide (A&M)
 1973: Matita Perê (Philips)
 1973: Jobim (MCA)
 1976: Urubu (Warner Bros.)
 1980: Terra Brasilis (Warner Bros.)
 1987: Passarim (Verve)
 1994: Antonio Brasileiro (Columbia)
 1995: Inédito (Ariola)
 1997: Minha Alma Canta (Lumiar)

Compilations
 1970: Look to the Sky (A&M) UK only
 1979: Sinatra–Jobim Sessions
 1987: Personalidade
 1990: Compact Jazz [Verve Music Group]
 1994: Verve Jazz Masters 13 [Verve Music Group]
 1995: Antonio Carlos Jobim: Composer (Warner Bros. 2-46114)
 1995: The Girl from Ipanema The Antonio Carlos Jobim Songbook (Verve/Polygram)
 1998: Jazz 'Round Midnight [Verve Music Group] 
 1999: The Best of Tom Jobim
 2000: The Tom Jobim Sessions (outtakes with various artists)
 2000: Antonio Carlos Jobim's Finest Hour [Verve Music Group]
 2002: The Outtakes (outtakes as a solo artist)
 2005: The Best of Antonio Carlos Jobim: 20th Century Masters/The Millennium Collection 
 2006: Sinfonia do Rio de Janeiro (Com Billy Blanco)
 2006: Sinatra-Jobim (outtakes with Frank Sinatra)
 2007: Antonio Carlos Jobim For Lovers [Verve Music Group] 
 2009: The Complete Tom Jobim (boxset)
 2016: 40 Sucessos de Ouro

Live albums 
 1977: Gravado ao Vivo no Canecão (with Vinicius, Toquinho, Miúcha)
 1986: Jazzvisions: Rio Revisited (with Gal Costa)
 1996: Antonio Carlos Jobim and Friends (with Shirley Horn, Jon Hendricks, Gal Costa, Joe Henderson, Herbie Hancock, Gonzalo Rubalcaba and others)
 2001: Tom Canta Vinícius: Ao Vivo (recorded in 1990)
 2004: Em Minas ao Vivo: Piano e Voz  (recorded in 1981)

Soundtracks 
 1959: Black Orpheus (Soundtrack)
 1970: The Adventurers (Soundtrack)
 1983: Gabriela, Cravo e Canela (Soundtrack)
 1986: Moments of Play (Soundtrack)
 1997: Lost Highway (Soundtrack)

As contributor 
 1958: Canção do Amor DemaisElizete Cardoso
 1959: Amor de Gente MoçaSylvia Telles
 1959: Chega de SaudadeJoão Gilberto
 1959: Por Tôda a Minha VidaLenita Bruno
 1960: O Amor, o Sorriso e a FlorJoão Gilberto
 1962: Do the Bossa Nova with Herbie Mann
 1962: Latin Fever with Herbie Mann
 1965: Recorded In RioJoão Gilberto, Herbie Mann
 1965: The Swinger from RioSérgio Mendes
 1966: Love, Strings and Jobim (various)
 1967: Antonio Carlos Jobim & Sergio Mendes
 1995: Abandoned GardenMichael Franks

With Billy Blanco 
 1954: Sinfonia Do Rio De Janeiro

With Vinicius de Moraes 
 1956: Orfeu da Conceição
 1961: Brasília – Sinfonia Da Alvorada

With Stan Getz 
 1963: Getz/Gilberto
 1963: Jazz Samba Encore! (with Luiz Bonfá)
 1964: Getz/Gilberto Vol. 2

With Dorival Caymmi 
 1964: Caymmi Visita Tom

With Astrud Gilberto 
 1965: The Astrud Gilberto Album

With Edu Lobo 
 1981: Edu & Tom

With Elis Regina 
 1974: Elis & Tom

With Miúcha 
 1977: Miúcha & Antônio Carlos Jobim
 1979: Miúcha & Tom Jobim

With Frank Sinatra 
 1967: Francis Albert Sinatra & Antônio Carlos Jobim
 1971: Sinatra & Company
 1994: "Fly Me to the Moon" – Duets II

Songs 
Lyrics by Vinicius de Moraes unless otherwise noted

 "A felicidade"
 "Água de Beber" ("Water To Drink")
 "Águas de Março" ("Waters of March")
 "Amor Sem Adeus"
 "Anos Dourados" ("Looks Like December")
 "As Praias Desertas"
 "Bonita"
 "Borzeguim"
 "Brigas Nunca Mais"
 "Caminhos Cruzados"
 "Canta, Canta Mais"
 "Chansong"
 "Chega de Saudade" ("No More Blues")
 "Chovendo na Roseira" ("Children's Games"; "Double Rainbow")
 "Corcovado" ("Quiet Nights of Quiet Stars")
 "Demais"
 "Desafinado" ("Off Key"; "Slightly Out of Tune")
 "Dindi"
 "Discussão"
 "Ela é Carioca"
 "Este Seu Olhar"
 "Estrada Branca" ("This Happy Madness")
 "Estrado do Sol" ("Road to the Sun")
 "Eu Não Existo Sem Você"
 "Eu Sei Que Vou Te Amar"
 "Falando de Amor"
 "Fotografia" ("Photograph")
 "Garota de Ipanema" ("The Girl from Ipanema")
 "Insensatez" ("How Insensitive")
 "Inútil Paisagem" ("Useless Landscape"; "If You Never Come to Me")
 "Ligia"
 "Look to the Sky"
 "Luíza"
 "Meditação" ("Meditation")
 "Modinha"
 "Nuvens Douradas" ("Golden Clouds")	
 "O Amor em Paz" ("Once I Loved")
 "O Grande Amor"
 "O Morro Não Tem Vez" ("Favela") 
 "Outra Vez" ("Once Again")
 "Passarim"
 "Pois É"
 "Por Causa de Você" ("Don't Ever Go Away")
 "Por Toda Minha Vida"
 "Retrato Em Branco E Preto" ("Portrait in Black and White")
 "Sabiá"
 "Samba do Avião"
 "Samba de Uma Nota Só" ("One Note Samba")
 "Se Todos Fossem Iguais A Você" ("Someone to Light Up My Life")
 "Só Danço Samba" ("I Only Dance Samba"; "Jazz Samba")
 "Só Tinha de Ser com Você"
 "Stone Flower"
 "Sucedeu Assim"
 "Surfboard"
 "Tema de Amor de Gabriela"
 "Tide"
 "Triste" ("Sad")
 "Two Kites"
 "Vivo Sonhando" ("Dreamer")
 "Vou Te Contar" ("Wave")

Concert films
 2002: Antonio Carlos Jobim: An All-Star Tribute (with Herbie Hancock, Joe Henderson, Shirley Horn, Jon Hendricks, Gonzalo Rubalcaba)
 2007: Antonio Carlos Jobim in Concert
 2007: Live at Montreal Jazz Festival
 2009: Tom Jobim: The Waters of March

References

Discographies of Brazilian artists
Bossa nova discographies
Discography